Aaron Keller (アーロン・キャラー) (born March 1, 1975) is a Canadian-born Japanese former professional ice hockey Defenceman.

Career
Born in Kamloops, British Columbia, Keller played junior hockey with his hometown team the Kamloops Blazers of the Western Hockey League and played with them for four seasons from 1992 to 1996. He then played his first professional season in 1996–97 with the Peoria Rivermen of the East Coast Hockey League, the Chicago Wolves of the International Hockey League and the Baltimore Bandits of the American Hockey League.

The next season, he moved to Sapporo, Japan, where he played three seasons for the (now defunct) team Sapporo Snow Brand, and the next season with the Sapporo Polaris (the team who replace the Sapporo Snow Brand, but they also folded after only one season). After the Sapporo Polaris was dissolved in 2002, he signed with the Oji Eagles and remained with the team for the remainder of his career until his retirement in 2014.

He was also a regular member of the Japan national team, debuting for them in 2004.

Career statistics

Awards
 WHL West Second All-Star Team – 1995
Best Defenseman (Asian Winter Games Top Division 2011)

References

Oji Eagle's players profile

1975 births
Baltimore Bandits players
Canadian ice hockey defencemen
Chicago Wolves (IHL) players
Sportspeople from Kamloops
Japanese ice hockey players
Canadian emigrants to Japan
Living people
Kamloops Blazers players
Oji Eagles players
Peoria Rivermen (ECHL) players
Ice hockey people from British Columbia
Asian Games silver medalists for Japan
Medalists at the 2011 Asian Winter Games
Asian Games medalists in ice hockey
Ice hockey players at the 2011 Asian Winter Games